Torsten Wruck (born 22 July 1969) is a retired German football defender.

References

1969 births
Living people
German footballers
1. FC Union Berlin players
1. FC Köln II players
FC 08 Homburg players
1. FC Saarbrücken players
2. Bundesliga players
Association football defenders
Footballers from Berlin